Wade Reynolds (born Charles Elwood Reynolds; June 5, 1929 – October 3, 2011) was a self-taught realist painter, Reynolds was best known for his figurative paintings often classified as California School of Light. He was commissioned to portray California governor George Deukmejian for his official state portrait. He is also known for his portraits of costume designer Noel Taylor and actress Agnes Moorehead.

Biography
Reynolds was born in Jasper, New York, in 1929. He began his professional art career in New York City where he was hired in 1958 to create the artwork depicted in the film The World of Suzie Wong. From 1959 on, Reynolds resided in California, living in Newport Beach, Oceanside and San Francisco. He also painted in the Los Angeles area.

Reynolds' work appeared in museums and galleries in San Francisco, Santa Barbara, and New York, Newport Beach and Santa Fe, New Mexico. Artist David Wheeler, with who Reynolds once shared a studio, referred to him as “the West Coast’s equivalent to Andrew Wyeth.”

He was an instructor at the Art Institute of Southern California (now the Laguna College of Art and Design) and at the Academy of Art (now the Academy of Art University) in San Francisco. He influenced students including Julio Reyes, Candice Bohanon, and Alia El-Bermani.

Reynolds died after a long bout with cancer.

References

Further reading
 Wade Reynolds: celebrations of nature and humanity By Matthew G. Sherwin, Arnot Art Museum; First Edition (2004)
 2005	 AskART.com Inc. -Dunbier, Lonnie Pierson (Editor) The Artists Bluebook	34,000 North American Artists to March 2005
 2005	Davenport, Ray	Davenport's Art Reference:	The Gold Edition
 2004	McGowan, Alison C (Editor)	Who's Who in American Art, 2004	2003 - 2004 (25th Edition)
 1993	Bowker R R	Who's Who in American Art-1993-1994, 20th Edition
 1986	Jaques Cattell Press	Who's Who in American Art-1986	1986
 1985	Krantz, Les	American Artists: An Illustrated Survey of Leading Contemporary Americans Wade Reynolds:	The Man and His Art

1929 births
2011 deaths
American realist painters
People from Steuben County, New York